Dhanaha Assembly constituency was an assembly constituency in Paschim Champaran district in the Indian state of Bihar.

Overview
It was part of Bagaha Lok Sabha constituency.

As a consequence of the orders of the Delimitation Commission of India, Dhanaha Assembly constituency ceased to exist in 2010.

Election results

1977-2015
In the October 2015 state assembly elections Dhirendra Pratap Singh Urf Rinku Singh defeated Rajesh Singh by a huge number of votes being an Independent candidate he scored approximately 63,000 votes in the October 2005 state assembly elections, Rajesh Singh of RJD won the 1 Dhanaha assembly seat defeating his nearest rival Ramadhar Yadav of SP. Contests in most years were multi cornered but only winners and runners are being mentioned. In February 2005 Rajesh Singh of RJD defeated Ramadhar Yadav of SP. Rajesh Singh representing BSP defeated Arun Kumar Tiwary, Independent. Vishnu Pr Kushwaha of SAP defeated Satan Yadav, Independent, in 1995. Shyam N. Prasad of Congress defeated Satan Yadav of Lok Dal (B) in 1990. Naradeswar Prasad Kushwaha of LD defeated Arun Kumar Tiwari, Independent in 1985. Hardeo Prasad of Congress defeated Rang Lall Prasad of Janata Party (Secular – Charan Singh) in 1980 and Yogendra Prasad Srivastava of Janata Party in 1977.

References

Former assembly constituencies of Bihar
Politics of West Champaran district